Walt Groller (born February 12, 1931 in Allentown, Pennsylvania) is an American polka musician.  He is generally considered one of the premier polka musicians in the world.

Early years

Groller was born in Allentown, Pennsylvania in the Lehigh Valley to Austrian immigrants. By the age of four, he had learned to play the accordion and to play and sing folk music songs. By age 12, he was performing professionally. At age 14, he started his own orchestra. Groller attended Allentown Central Catholic High School in center city Allentown.

In 1952, at age 21, Groller was inducted into the United States Armed Services. He served in South Korea with the United States Army. He was discharged two years later, and resumed his orchestra career, performing for live audiences and on radio.

Career
He was signed by Stella Records and produced seven albums and several 45s for Stella.  Perhaps his best known album was New Christmas Songs.

Following the release of his Stella Record albums, Groller started his own production label, Chalet Records in Whitehall Township, Pennsylvania). and released 11 albums through it. Well known hits included "Say Thank You Dear", "Give Her Roses", and "Papa, the Old Accordion Man". Groller toured the United States and Europe in support of the albums, gaining an especially loyal following in Austria, Germany and Switzerland.

Groller hosts a weekly television show, Cafe Internationale, which airs on Fridays. A recording of his radio play, Forty Years of Music: The Old Radio Band, was released by Chalet Records.

In 1986, he was inducted in the International Polka Association's "Hall of Fame". In 1988, he was nominated for a Grammy Award. In 1990, the government of Austria presented Groller with the Austrian Decoration of Merit in Gold, an award given in recognition of those who help to preserve Austria's culture.  Groller also received a letter of commendation from President Bill Clinton.  In May 1995, he received Polka News Network's "Lifetime Polka Music Award".

Discography

Albums
Bei Uns Gibts Polka
I Wish I Were a Little Boy
It's Polkamatic
New Christmas Songs

Compilations
Sharing Memories - Volume 1

Singles
"Dut Du Du Dut Polka"
"5 Guys From Pennsyltucky"

Personal life
Groller is married with three children, including two sons (Joe and Tom) and a daughter (Anita).  Groller's son Joe plays drums in Groller's orchestra.  Groller currently resides in Whitehall Township, Pennsylvania. He has a large extended family.

External links
Walt Groller biography at International Polka Association Hall of Fame

References

1931 births
Living people
21st-century American composers
21st-century American male musicians
Allentown Central Catholic High School alumni
Musicians from Allentown, Pennsylvania
Polka musicians